Walney School is a secondary school on Walney Island in Barrow-in-Furness, Cumbria.
As a result of the Education Act 1944, Walney Island needed to have its own secondary school. Today (2020) it is an 11 – 16 Academy with approximately 585 students currently on roll.

History
Vickerstown is an area of Barrow-in-Furness, is an example of a planned estate built for workers by a company needing to expand. It was constructed in the early 20th century by Vickers Shipbuilding and Engineering, on Walney Island; an island connected to the British mainland via Barrow Island, by a swing bridge. The school is on the edge of Vickerstown.
As a result of the Education Act 1944, Walney Island needed to have its own secondary school. The present Sandy Gap site was agreed in 1951 and the school built.

Lord Cavendish opened a new Sensory Garden in 2003.

Walney School achieved Specialist Engineering Status in 2009, in Winter 2010 began to expand, by building a £6m redevelopment and extension. It will has 10 new classrooms, two music rooms, two art rooms and an additional science block. The single storey classrooms also have a Sedam turf roof, with plants growing on top to have an environmental and visual appeal. The work was meant to be undertaken in five phases, taking 65 weeks, for completion in August, the next year but due to bad weather was finally completed in summer 2012. Although to go along with the Specialist Engineering Status the £300,000 engineering innovation centre was built and completed in September 2011.

In September 2014 the school converted to academy status as part of the Queen Katherine School Multi-Academy Trust.

Since June 2022 George Hastwell School have been occupying four of the classrooms in Walney School during Thursdays and will be moving in fully as of September 2022.

Context
Walney School is an 11 – 16 Academy with approximately 585 students currently on roll. It converted to an academy in September 2014, when the predecessor school was condemned by Ofsted and placed in special measures. A new headteacher was appointed other staff transferred.  It is sponsored by  Queen Katherine School multi-academy trust, who has strengthened the governing body and given significant support to the school leaders  including support for financial management and human resources issues, and training for senior and middle leaders. 

Ofsted however said that the  school did not meet the government’s floor standard in 2015. The floor standard being the minimum expectation for pupils’ progress across a number of subjects including English and mathematics. Outcomes have remained stubbornly low for too long. Pupils leaving the school in 2015 and 2016 were not well prepared for the next stages of education, because too few made the expected progress in English and mathematics. Performance across a range of subjects was low. The school performed inadequately when compared to the national picture in terms of the proportions of pupils attaining the top grades at General Certificate of Secondary Educationin many subjects.In 2016 the Progress 8 score  was well below the national average. The school's most able pupils achieved poorly overall, especially in mathematics and science. There large differences between the achievement of the school’s disadvantaged pupils and that of other pupils nationally. The most able disadvantaged pupils achieved on average more than one General Certificate of Secondary Education grade less than did their peers.

Achievements
At General Certificate of Secondary Education and General National Vocational Qualification, the school is ranked 33rd out of the forty-seven secondary schools in Cumbria. It has no Sixth Form, so does not teach at 'A'-level.

References

External links
 Walney School at dcsf.gov.uk (including location map)
 School closed in April 2008 after petrol bomb
 EduBase

Academies in Cumbria
School buildings in the United Kingdom destroyed by arson
Schools in Barrow-in-Furness
Secondary schools in Cumbria